Loloru is a pyroclastic shield volcano located in the southern region of Bougainville Island, within the Autonomous Region of Bougainville of northeastern Papua New Guinea. 

The volcano's summit consists of two nested calderas, with an andesitic lava dome.

Lake Loloru

Lake Loloru is a crescent-shaped volcanic crater lake covering  within the volcano caldera.  It is a sacred place of South Bougainvillians, who traditionally believe the souls of their dead go here upon death.

See also
 
 List of volcanoes in Papua New Guinea

References 
 

Volcanoes of Bougainville Island
Lakes of Papua New Guinea
Volcanic crater lakes
Geography of the Autonomous Region of Bougainville
Mountains of Papua New Guinea
Pyroclastic shields
Sacred lakes
Shield volcanoes of Papua New Guinea
Calderas of Papua New Guinea